Girlicious took part in a tour of Canada as the opening act of the Unbreakable Tour with the Backstreet Boys that started on July 30, 2008 and ended September 6, 2008. 
Girlicious returned to Canada to tour for the second time in 2008, with special guest Danny Fernandes; thus began the Girlicious Tour.

The first set date was scheduled in Fredericton on October 15. Girlicious wrapped up their tour in Canada with Danny Fernandes at the beginning of November 2008 for the first leg. Girlicious started the second leg on March 5 and ending March 29. Danny Fernandes also Opened for them on the second leg as well.

Additional notes

 In May 2009 they performed as a supporting act for The Circus Starring Britney Spears in Montreal Instead of the Pussycat Dolls.
 They added a 2nd Show on the same day for Yellowknife, Northwest Territory, Prince Albert, Saskatchewan and Sarnia, Ontario

Set list

Opening acts 

Danny Fernandes (North America) (parts 1 and 2)
Rosette (Vancouver) (part 3)
Elise Estrada (Winnipeg) (part 3)

Tour dates

Part 1 Tour

Box Office Score Data

Notes and references

2008 concert tours
2009 concert tours